Poova Thalaiya may refer to:
 Poova Thalaiya (1969 film), an Indian Tamil-language comedy film
 Poova Thalaiya (2011 film), an Indian Tamil-language action film